Dick Allan (born 16 March 1939 in Glasgow, Scotland) is a former Scottish international rugby union player. Allan played as a scrum-half.

Rugby Union career

Amateur career

Allan went to Hutchesons' Grammar School in Glasgow.

Leaving school Allan then played for Hutchesons' GSFP.

Provincial career

He played for Glasgow District in the Scottish Inter-District Championship, captaining the side.

He played in the 1964–65 Scottish Inter-District Championship when Glasgow shared the title with South of Scotland.

International career

He played for Scotland only the once, on 22 February 1969. He played in the Five Nations match at Murrayfield against Ireland. Scotland lost the match 16–0.

Hopes were high for Allan before the match as it was noted he had a 'devastating break'.

In a match where Jim Telfer suffered concussion and Chris Rea suffered a dislocated shoulder for the Scots, The Glasgow Herald later noted: "Though Peter Brown won occasional ball, Allan rarely received tidy distribution. Again from the scrummage with the Scottish heel frequently upset by the Irish wheel, Allan was given much worthless ball. In such circumstances the scrum half did well to prevent the effect of bad ball from being multiplied by the close attention that Colin Telfer was paid by the destructive Jim Davidson. Allan's game had to brave and selfless, and only the once had he the chance to attempt a close quarter break from one of the few rucks that Scotland won, after a charge by Rodger Arneil. Colin Telfer was caught before that thrust could be extended."

References

External links
ESPN Profile

1939 births
Living people
Scotland international rugby union players
Hutchesons' GSFP players
Scottish rugby union players
Rugby union players from Glasgow
Glasgow District (rugby union) players
Rugby union scrum-halves